Leo Picard (3 June 1900 – 4 April 1997), was an Israeli geologist and an expert in the field of hydrogeology.

Biography
Yehuda Leo Picard was born in Germany in 1900, and studied at universities in Freiburg and Berlin, in Germany, and in Paris and London, and taught at the University of Florence, Italy.

Picard visited Mandate Palestine in 1922 and emigrated there in 1924, where he established the Department of Geology at the Hebrew University of Jerusalem. In 1943, he published his book "Structure and Evolution of Palestine", which become a primary book for the study of geology in Israel.

Leo Picard was an expert hydrogeologist and an outstanding general geologist. He wrote about paleontology and stratigraphy, structural geology and tectonics, mineralogy and ore deposits. Well-known is his contribution to the debate on the tectonics of the Dead Sea Rift. Picard was doubtful whether left-lateral offset of some 100 km took place along the Rift, and suggested instead that the rift was developed and constrained by extension.

In 1955, he was appointed president of the UNESCO committee of experts for arid areas. Following such appointment, he became an international consultant, and his investigations have assisted the development of many countries in Africa and Latin America.

He died in 1997 in Kibbutz Ginegar in northern Israel.

Awards and recognition
 From 1951 to 1953, Picard served as the first president of the Israel Geological Society.
 In 1958, he was awarded the Israel Prize, in life sciences.
 In 1981, he received the award of Yakir Yerushalayim (Worthy Citizen of Jerusalem) from the city of Jerusalem.
 A street has been named after him in the Har Homa neighbourhood of Jerusalem.
 The Leo Picard Groundwater Research Center at the Rehovot campus of the Hebrew University of Jerusalem, is named after him.

Works in English, French and German
1923, Die fraenkische Alb von Weissenburg i. B. und Umgebung
1928, Ein Eocaenprofil des Gilboas in Palaestina
1928, Zur Geologie der Kischon-Ebene
1929, Zur Geologie der Besan-Ebene
1930, Upper Cretaceous (chiefly Campanian and Maestrichtian) Gasteropoda and Pelecypoda from Palestine
1931, Geological researches in the Judean desert : with geological map and illustrations
1932, Zur geologie des mittleren Jordantales :(zwischen Wadi El-Oeschsche und Tiberiassee)
1933, Zur postmiocänen Entwicklungsgeschichte der Kontinentalbecken Nord-Palästinas
1936, Conditions of underground water in the Western Emek (plain of Esdraelon)
1936, On the geology of the Gaza-Beersheba district
1937, On the structure of the Arabian Peninsula
1937, On the geology of the central coastal plain : with a geological sketch map and 7 figures in the text
1938, The geology of New Jerusalem
1939, Outline on the tectonics of the earth :with special emphasis upon Africa
1940, Groundwater in Palestine
1943, Structure and evolution of Palestine, with comparative notes on neighbouring countries
1952, Geomorphogenic regions of the Negev, 1:250,000
1952, Geomorphogeny of Israel
1954, The structural pattern of Palestine, Israel and Jordan
1962, Rapport d’une mission d’etude geologique au Dahomey
1963, The quaternary in the Northern Jordan Valley
1964, Geological map, Israel
1965, The geological evolution of the quaternary in the central-northern Jordan Graben, Israel
1966, Vom Bodensee nach Erez Israel : Pionierarbeit fur Geologie und Grundwasser seit 1924
1966, Stratigraphic position of the Ubeidiya formation
1966, Geological report on the lower Pleistocene deposits of the Ubeidiya excavations
1968, On the structure of the Rhinegraben with comparative notes on Levantgraben feature
1973, General aspects of Israel’s oil search
1974, The Triassic
1987, The Jurassic stratigraphy in Israel  and the adjacent countries

References

See also
List of Israel Prize recipients

1900 births
1997 deaths
20th-century German Jews
German emigrants to Mandatory Palestine
University of Freiburg alumni
Humboldt University of Berlin alumni
University of Paris alumni
Alumni of the University of London
Academic staff of the University of Florence
Academic staff of the Hebrew University of Jerusalem
Israeli geologists
Israel Prize in life sciences recipients
Israel Prize in life sciences recipients who were geologists
Hydrogeologists
20th-century geologists